Robert "Robin" John Tillyard FRS (31 January 1881 – 13 January 1937) was an English–Australian entomologist and geologist.

Early life and education

Tillyard was the son of J. J. Tillyard and his wife Mary Ann Frances, née Wilson and was born at Norwich, Norfolk. He was educated at Dover College and intended to enter the army but was rejected on account of having suffered from rheumatism. He won a scholarship for classics at Oxford and another for mathematics at Cambridge, and decided to go to Queens' College, Cambridge. He graduated senior optime in 1903. He went to Australia in 1904 and was appointed second mathematics and science master at Sydney Grammar School. While working as a science master Tillyard found time to publish extensively on dragonflies. After nine years with Sydney Grammar School, he resigned and undertook a research degree in biology at Sydney University and took his research BSc degree in 1914.

Career
He was seriously injured in a railway accident in 1914 and had a slow recovery, but in 1915 became Linnean Macleay Fellow in Zoology at the University of Sydney. He was appointed lecturer in Zoology in 1917. In the same year he published in the Cambridge Zoological series, The Biology of Dragonflies, and he also received the Crisp prize and medal of the Linnean Society of London. In 1920 he was appointed chief of the department of biology at the Cawthron Institute, Nelson, New Zealand. In the same year the honorary degree of D.Sc. was conferred on him by Cambridge University.

Tillyard did good work in New Zealand and established a reputation for his work on the biological control of plant and insect pests. He is popularly best known for his introduction of a small wasp as an agent for controlling woolly aphis in apple-trees. In 1925 he was elected a fellow of the Royal Society, London, and in the following year he published his book on The Insects of Australia and New Zealand, a comprehensive work with many illustrations. This book became the standard work on Australasian entomology for some fifty years. He published widely and authoritatively on Odonata, Plecoptera, Neuroptera, and other orders, and on fossil insects, the wing venation of insects, and the phylogeny of insects. In this year he was awarded the Trueman Wood medal of the Royal Society of Arts and Science, London, and was appointed assistant-director of the Cawthron Institute.

He returned to Australia in 1928 to become chief Commonwealth entomologist under the Commonwealth Scientific and Industrial Research Organisation. He held this position for six years, but the state of his health compelled him to retire on a pension in 1934. Rohan Rivett described those CSIRO years as follows:

'When the CSIR sought for a man to tackle the huge problems of destruction wrought by insects on the Australian economy one candidate stood out above all others. He was Dr R J Tillyard of the Cawthron Institute. Tillyard's collections and descriptions of insect life had made him a world figure. After difficult negotiations he was brought to Canberra, made a profound impression on members of both Houses of Parliament in a unique address and was appointed Chief of the Entomology Division of CSIR in March 1928 at a salary higher than that of any other. This appointment could have been a major tragedy for CSIR. Tillyard, for all his brilliance, suffered such mental stresses that he was difficult as subordinate, colleague or chief. Within months Rivett [CEO of CSIR] had resignations pending from almost every scientist who had come into frequent contact with Tillyard. ...
In July 1933 Dr Tillyard suffered a breakdown in New York.  Effective control of his department had for some time fallen on Dr A J Nicholson.  Finally, after prolonged sick leave had failed to produce any assurance from experts of Tillyard's ultimate recovery, Dr Nicholson ... took over as Chief of Economic Entomology.'

While Tillyard was holding the CSIR position he was awarded the R. M. Johnston memorial medal of the Royal Society of Tasmania in 1929 and the Clarke Medal of the Royal Society of New South Wales in 1931. In 1935 he was given the von Mueller medal. His health improved after his retirement and he busily continued his scientific studies. He was well known in the United States which he had visited more than once. He died following a motor accident on 13 January 1937. He married in 1909 Patricia Cruske who survived him with four daughters. In his last years Tillyard was much interested in some work on supposed pre-Cambrian fossils in South Australia which was done in co operation with Edgeworth David. The account of their investigations is contained in Memoir on Fossils of the late Pre-Cambrian, by David and Tillyard, published in 1936. Tillyard was one of the most influential workers on the fossils of the Elmo Permian deposits, believing that the key to the true classification of insects would be found in these early fossils.

Tillyard was killed following a car accident near  Goulburn between Canberra and Sydney. The car had skidded and rolled over and he had hit the windscreen and broken his neck. He died at Goulburn Hospital.

Psychical research
In the 1920s Tillyard became interested in psychical research. On his visits to England he worked with Harry Price at his National Laboratory of Psychical Research. He became vice-president of the laboratory in 1926.

In 1926 there was a minor controversy in the Nature journal amongst several writers. This was caused by Tillyard writing a predominantly supportive review of Arthur Conan Doyle's book The History of Spiritualism. Critics such as A. A. Campbell Swinton pointed to the evidence of fraud in mediumship and Doyle's nonscientific approach to the subject.

Tillyard had attended séances with the medium Mina Crandon in Boston. He managed to persuade Sir Richard Gregory the editor of Nature to publish his findings. In the 18 August 1928 issue of Nature in a paper entitled Evidence of Survival of a Human Personality he presented his observations on Crandon's séance phenomena and his belief in life after death.

Publications
Entomology
Mesozoic and Tertiary Insects of Queensland and New South Wales (1916)
The Biology of Dragonflies: (Odonata or Paraneuroptera (1917)
The Insects of Australia and New Zealand (1926)

Psychical Research

References

Bibliography

D. F. Waterhouse, K. R. Norris, 'Tillyard, Robin John (1881–1937)', Australian Dictionary of Biography, Volume 12, MUP, 1990, pp 232–233
R. J. Tillyard, at windsofkansas.com

External links
 

1881 births
1937 deaths
Geologists from Norwich
Alumni of Queens' College, Cambridge
Australian entomologists
British emigrants to Australia
Fellows of the Royal Society
Parapsychologists
People educated at Dover College
People associated with the Cawthron Institute
20th-century New Zealand scientists
20th-century Australian zoologists